= 8/2 =

8/2 may refer to:

- August 2 (month-day date notation)
- February 8 (day-month date notation)
- The fraction otherwise known as 4
